The 1976 Six Hours of Vallelunga was the second round of the 1976 World Championship for Makes. It took place at the Vallelunga Circuit, Italy on  4 April 1976 and was contested by Group 5 Special Production Cars and Group 4 Grand Touring Cars.

Official results

1976 in World Championship for Makes
1976 in Italian motorsport